Algies Bay is a northern coastal suburb of Auckland, in New Zealand. It is on the Mahurangi Peninsula about 68 kilometres (by road) north of the city centre.

Highfield Garden Reserve is an area of public land just north of Algies Bay. Until 1985, it was a privately owned flower-growing and orchard business, which also had donkeys. The owners gifted it to the public, and it now has gardens, walks, fruit trees, and a donkey sanctuary.

Scandrett Regional Park and Mahurangi Regional Park East are south of Algies Bay.

Demographics
Algies Bay is part of the larger Algies Bay-Scotts Landing statistical area.

Algies Bay had a population of 762 at the 2018 New Zealand census, an increase of 111 people (17.1%) since the 2013 census, and an increase of 150 people (24.5%) since the 2006 census. There were 318 households, comprising 360 males and 402 females, giving a sex ratio of 0.9 males per female, with 87 people (11.4%) aged under 15 years, 60 (7.9%) aged 15 to 29, 276 (36.2%) aged 30 to 64, and 330 (43.3%) aged 65 or older.

Ethnicities were 92.1% European/Pākehā, 5.1% Māori, 1.6% Pacific peoples, 6.7% Asian, and 1.6% other ethnicities. People may identify with more than one ethnicity.

Although some people chose not to answer the census's question about religious affiliation, 40.9% had no religion, 48.8% were Christian, 0.8% were Hindu and 1.2% had other religions.

Of those at least 15 years old, 132 (19.6%) people had a bachelor's or higher degree, and 144 (21.3%) people had no formal qualifications. 84 people (12.4%) earned over $70,000 compared to 17.2% nationally. The employment status of those at least 15 was that 192 (28.4%) people were employed full-time, 99 (14.7%) were part-time, and 12 (1.8%) were unemployed.

Algies Bay-Scotts Landing statistical area

Algies Bay-Scotts Landing had a population of 1,185 at the 2018 New Zealand census, an increase of 144 people (13.8%) since the 2013 census, and an increase of 252 people (27.0%) since the 2006 census. There were 498 households, comprising 564 males and 621 females, giving a sex ratio of 0.91 males per female. The median age was 60.2 years (compared with 37.4 years nationally), with 135 people (11.4%) aged under 15 years, 99 (8.4%) aged 15 to 29, 471 (39.7%) aged 30 to 64, and 477 (40.3%) aged 65 or older.

Ethnicities were 93.4% European/Pākehā, 6.3% Māori, 2.0% Pacific peoples, 4.3% Asian, and 1.5% other ethnicities. People may identify with more than one ethnicity.

The percentage of people born overseas was 23.8, compared with 27.1% nationally.

Although some people chose not to answer the census's question about religious affiliation, 45.6% had no religion, 43.3% were Christian, 0.8% were Hindu, 0.8% were Buddhist and 1.0% had other religions.

Of those at least 15 years old, 240 (22.9%) people had a bachelor's or higher degree, and 189 (18.0%) people had no formal qualifications. The median income was $29,500, compared with $31,800 nationally. 159 people (15.1%) earned over $70,000 compared to 17.2% nationally. The employment status of those at least 15 was that 327 (31.1%) people were employed full-time, 168 (16.0%) were part-time, and 24 (2.3%) were unemployed.

Notes

Populated places in the Auckland Region
Matakana Coast
Beaches of the Auckland Region